The leopard moray eel, tiger moray eel or dragon moray (Enchelycore pardalis), is a species of marine fish in the family Muraenidae.

The leopard moray eel is widespread throughout the Indo-Pacific oceans from Réunion to the Hawaiian, Line and Society Islands, north to southern Japan, southern Korea, and south to New Caledonia.

It inhabits coral and rocky reefs at depth range from 8 to 60 m.

Its length is up to 92 cm.

This eel is characterized by its narrow, curved jaws, vivid red stripes on the head, and elongated tubular nostrils.

It is chiefly nocturnal; because of this and its preference for cryptic habitats, it is seldom seen. It feeds primarily on fishes and small cephalopods.

References

External links
http://www.marinespecies.org/aphia.php?p=taxdetails&id=217472

pardalis
Fish described in 1846